Julianne “Anne” Abernathy (born April 12, 1953) is a luge athlete from the United States Virgin Islands and is the oldest female athlete to compete in the Winter Olympics. The 2006 Winter Olympics were her sixth. Despite her age, she is a strong competitor with numerous international podium finishes, and she is consistently ranked in the top 20 world rankings. She is known within luge circles as "Grandma Luge."  She is training for the 2024 Summer Olympics as an archer.

Career 

Her top finishes include third place at the Nations Cup in Igls, Austria in January 2004, and third place at the Nations Cup in Königssee, Germany, February 2004. She finished in the top 10 in seven of the eight events in the 2004-2005 Nations Cup series. Abernathy finished 25th in the 37th World Championships in 2004 in Nagano, Japan, but did not compete in the 2005 championships in Park City, Utah due to injuries suffered during homologation at the Cesana Pariol track in Cesana, Italy three weeks earlier.

Abernathy suffered a serious accident during a World Cup race in Altenberg, Germany in January 2001 that resulted in a severe brain injury. To recover from the injury, she used an alternative medicine treatment involving controlling rockets in a video game through electrical impulses from brain waves, a therapy designed to help her retrain her brain to compensate for the damaged areas. The therapy was successful and Abernathy was able to return to competition in time to qualify for the 2002 Winter Olympics. The story of Abernathy's crash and recovery was featured on the Discovery Health Channel series Impact: Stories of Survival.

During practice for the competition at the 2006 Winter Olympics, Abernathy crashed and broke her wrist and her scapula, and was forced to withdraw from competition.

Abernathy is the oldest woman to ever compete in the Winter Olympic Games, breaking the old record during the 2002 Salt Lake City Olympics.  She is the only woman to qualify for six Winter Olympic Games and one of only two female athletes to compete in five Winter Olympics.  In 2006, she became the first woman over 50 to qualify for the Winter Olympics.

Abernathy was the first woman to qualify for six Winter Olympics. In the 2002 Winter Olympic Games in Salt Lake City she became the oldest woman to ever compete in the Winter Games. She is the oldest female Olympian in any Olympic Games (Winter or Summer) and the first woman over the age of 50 in the Winter Olympics.

During the Albertville Winter Olympics, she became the first athlete to compete with a camera on board, a feat that was nominated for an Emmy in technical broadcast achievement.

In the 1994 Winter Olympics in Lillehammer, Norway, Abernathy became the first athlete to create an on-line diary (now known as a blog) which was an exclusive on AOL.

Before her first Olympic appearance in 1988, Abernathy was diagnosed and treated for non-Hodgkin's lymphoma (cancer). Although the cancer returned several times during her sports career, the fact was kept hidden from the public through three Olympic appearances until it was revealed in a front-page article of The Washington Post'' prior to the 1998 Nagano Olympics.

References

External links
 
 
 
 Safety issues addressed following the unsuccessful luge homologations in January 2005, featuring Abernathy

1953 births
American women bloggers
American bloggers
United States Virgin Islands female lugers
Lugers at the 1988 Winter Olympics
Lugers at the 1992 Winter Olympics
Lugers at the 1994 Winter Olympics
Lugers at the 1998 Winter Olympics
Lugers at the 2002 Winter Olympics
Lugers at the 2006 Winter Olympics
Living people
Olympic lugers of the United States Virgin Islands
People from Saint Thomas, U.S. Virgin Islands
21st-century American women